Vishwanath Ram is an elected representative of the Rajpur, Bihar Assembly constituency of Buxar District. He is a member of Bihar Vidhansabha. Vishwanath contested the 2020 Bihar assembly election as a member of the Congress Party and defeated Santosh Kumar Nirala of JDU with a huge margin. Being a most prominent Dalit figure in ruling alliance of Bihar, it is being heard that Vishwanath Ram can soon became minister in Bihar Government.

References

Bihar MLAs 2020–2025
Indian National Congress politicians from Bihar
Living people
Year of birth missing (living people)